The Úhlava is a  long river in the Czech Republic, a right tributary of the Radbuza. It passes the villages and towns Nýrsko, Janovice, Bezděkov, Klatovy, Švihov, Lužany, and Přeštice before flowing into the river Radbuza at the south edge of Plzeň. Its major affluent is the Chodská Úhlava.

References

Rivers of the Plzeň Region
Bohemian Forest